Wallace Ingalls (November 22, 1859 – February 3, 1936) was an American lawyer and politician.

Ingalls was born in the town of Linn,  Walworth County, Wisconsin, on November 22, 1859. Ingalls received his law degree from Albany Law School. He was the district attorney of Walworth County, Wisconsin from 1892 to 1896 and was a Republican. Ingalls practiced law in Sharon, Wisconsin, then in Elkhorn, Wisconsin and later moved to Racine, Wisconsin and practiced law there. He was also a farmer. Ingalls served in the Wisconsin State Assembly in 1909, 1921, and from 1925 to 1929. Ingalls died of a heart attack in 1936 at his home in the Town of Linn, in Walworth County, Wisconsin.

Notes

References

1859 births
1936 deaths
Politicians from Racine, Wisconsin
People from Walworth County, Wisconsin
Albany Law School alumni
Farmers from Wisconsin
Wisconsin lawyers
Republican Party members of the Wisconsin State Assembly
People from Sharon, Wisconsin
People from Elkhorn, Wisconsin